The Keelung City Indigenous Cultural Hall is a cultural center in Zhongzheng District, Keelung, Taiwan.

Architecture
The cultural center is housed in a 5-story building. The first floor houses an activity, while the third and fourth floors are the exhibition hall. The top most floor is linked to the indigenous culture square. It consists of sculptures, houses and a viewing platform.

See also
 List of tourist attractions in Taiwan

References

External links

 

Cultural centers in Keelung